The Battle of the San Gabriels was an 1839 skirmish in the Texas–Indian wars.

The battle began on 17 May 1839. A company of Texas Rangers under Lt. James O. Rice had pursued the Mexican agent Manuel Flores and his party of Mexicans and Indians, following their murder of four surveyors working between Seguin and San Antonio, Texas. Battle was commenced on the north San Gabriel River, after the 2 day pursuit. In the first charge, Flores was killed and his company fled, abandoning a supply train intended to equip the Indians of East Texas for a revolt against the Texians. In the captured baggage, Rice discovered letters between Flores and Vicente Córdova as well as instructions from Mexican general Valentín Canalizo, detailing the Córdova Rebellion. These letters contradicted The Bowl's previous denials of involvement with Córdova's revolt and led to the Cherokee War.

A marker was placed near the site in 1936.

See also
 Timeline of the Republic of Texas
 Córdova Rebellion
 Battle of the Neches
 Mathew Caldwell

Bibliography
 
 
 "Foreign Influences," including Córdova's letter. Texas Library & Archives Commission. Retrieved 20 Feb 2010.

References

Conflicts in 1839
Texas–Indian Wars
Wars involving the indigenous peoples of North America
San Gabriel
1839 in the Republic of Texas